= Euneika Rogers-Sipp =

American artist

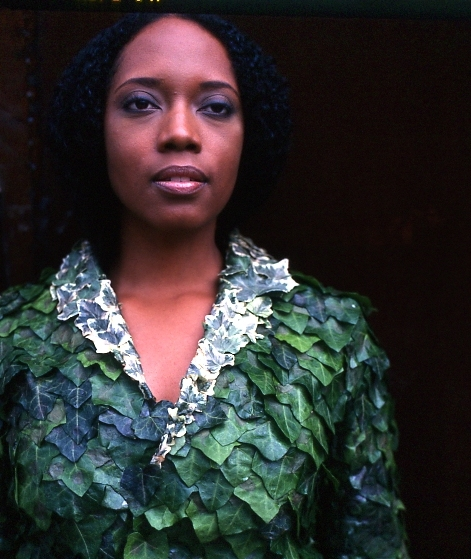
Euneika Rogers Sipp

Euneika Rogers-Sipp (born September 8, 1968), whose work appears under the name Ndgo Bunting, is an American conceptual artist whose work in racial justice and healing and cultural tourism is featured in the book Southern Women: More than 100 Stories of Innovators, Artists, and Icons.

Rogers-Sipp was awarded a Loeb Fellowship from the Harvard Graduate School of Design in 2016, where she contributed to diversity and inclusion initiatives, focusing on creating educational programs and community-based design projects. She also leads the Black Belt Community-Based Tourism Network, which mobilizes local resources to enhance the socio-economic infrastructure in underserved areas.
